The 1946 Dartmouth Indians football team was an American football team that represented Dartmouth College in the Ivy League during the 1946 college football season. In their fourth season under head coach Tuss McLaughry, the Indians compiled a 3–6 record, and were outscored 194 to 91 by opponents. Thomas Douglas was the team captain.

Dartmouth played its home games at Memorial Field on the college campus in Hanover, New Hampshire.

Schedule

After the season

The 1947 NFL Draft was held on December 16, 1946. The following Dartmouth Indian was selected.

References

Dartmouth
Dartmouth Big Green football seasons
Dartmouth Indians football